Ust-Bolsheretsk is a rural locality (a selo) and the administrative center of Ust-Bolsheretsky District, Kamchatka Krai, Russia. Population:

References

Notes

Sources

Rural localities in Kamchatka Krai